Dysoxylum crassum is a tree in the family Meliaceae. The specific epithet  is from the Latin meaning "thick", referring to the parts of the flowers.

Description
The bark is fawn-coloured to dark purplish brown. The sweetly scented flowers are pale green to creamy-white. The fruits are round, at least  in diameter.

Distribution and habitat
Dysoxylum crassum is endemic to Borneo.

References

crassum
Endemic flora of Borneo
Trees of Borneo
Plants described in 1994
Flora of the Borneo lowland rain forests